Jiří Říha (born September 18, 1992) is a Czech professional ice hockey player who currently plays with HC VERVA Litvínov  in the Czech Extraliga.

References

External links

1992 births
Living people
Czech ice hockey forwards
Czech ice hockey defencemen
HC Bílí Tygři Liberec players
People from Opočno
Sportspeople from the Hradec Králové Region